Separatism is the advocacy of cultural, ethnic, tribal, religious, racial, governmental, or gender separation from the larger group. As with secession, separatism conventionally refers to full political separation. Groups simply seeking greater autonomy are not separatist as such. Some discourse settings equate separatism with religious segregation, racial segregation, or sex segregation, while other discourse settings take the broader view that separation by choice may serve useful purposes and is not the same as government-enforced segregation. There is some academic debate about this definition, and in particular how it relates to secessionism, as has been discussed online.

Separatist groups practice a form of identity politics, or political activity and theorizing founded in the shared experiences of the group's members. Such groups believe attempts at integration with dominant groups compromise their identity and ability to pursue greater self-determination. However, economic and political factors usually are critical in creating strong separatist movements as opposed to less ambitious identity movements.

Motivations

Groups may have one or more motivations for separation, including:
 Emotional resentment and hatred of rival communities.
 Protection from genocide and ethnic cleansing.
 Resistance by victims of oppression, including denigration of their language, culture or religion.
 Influence and propaganda by those inside and outside the region who hope to gain politically from intergroup conflict and hatred.
 Economic and political dominance of one group that does not share power and privilege in an egalitarian fashion.
 Economic motivations: seeking to end economic exploitation by more powerful group or, conversely, to escape economic redistribution from a richer to a poorer group.
 Preservation of threatened religious, language or other cultural tradition.
 Destabilization from one separatist movement giving rise to others.
 Geopolitical power vacuum from breakup of larger states or empires.
 Continuing fragmentation as more and more states break up.
 Feeling that the perceived nation was added to the larger state by illegitimate means.
 The perception that the state can no longer support one's own group or has betrayed their interests.
 Opposition to political decisions.

Types
Ethnic separatism can be based on cultural, linguistic as well as religious or racial differences. Ethnic separatist movements were relevant since they represented historical delineations between states, or in recent times, were the cause of conflicts between peoples in Europe, Africa and Asia with different ethnic/linguistic origins.

Separatism by continent 

 List of active separatist movements in Africa
 List of active separatist movements in Asia
 List of active separatist movements in Europe
 List of active separatist movements in North America
 List of active separatist movements in Oceania
 List of active separatist movements in South America

Gender separatism
The relationship between gender and separatism is complex. Feminist separatism is women's choosing to separate from ostensibly male-defined, male-dominated institutions, relationships, roles and activities. Lesbian separatism advocates lesbianism as the logical result of feminism. Some separatist feminists and lesbian separatists have chosen to live apart in intentional community, cooperatives, and on land trusts. Queer nationalism (or "Gay separatism") seeks a community distinct and separate from other social groups. On the other hand, the male supremacist MGTOW movement it's considered sometimes a male-gender separatism, as at the center of this ideology is the notion of male separatism where men should be a part of a feminist-biased society, proposing even an utopical no-women state.

Geographical and socioeconomic separatism 

Some examples include:
Alberta separatism
Berber separatism in North Africa
Cape Independence
Cascadian separatists
Catalan independence movement
Provisional Revolutionary Government of Cibao
Hong Kong independence movement
New England New State Movement
Malaysian Sabah and Sarawak separatists
Quebec sovereignty movement
Scottish independence
Taiwanese independence

Racial separatism

Some separatist groups seek to separate from others along racial lines. They oppose interracial marriage and integration with other races and seek separate schools, businesses, churches and other institutions, and often separate societies, territories, countries, and governments:

 Black separatism (also known as black nationalism) is the most prominent wave advancing the concepts of "Black racial identity" in the United States and has been advanced by black leaders like Marcus Garvey and organizations such as the Nation of Islam. Critical race theorists like New York University's Derrick Bell and University of Colorado's Richard Delgado argue that US legal, education and political systems are rife with blatant racism. They support efforts like "all-black" schools and dorms and question the efficacy and merit of government-enforced integration. In 2008 statements by Barack Obama's former pastor Jeremiah Wright, Jr., revived the issue of the current relevance of black separatism.
 Latin American concepts of racial identity such as the bronze race and La Raza Cósmica are found in the small separatist Raza Unida Party. The Chicano Movement (or Chicano nation) in the United States sought to recreate Aztlán, the mythical homeland of the Aztecs comprising the Southwestern United States.
 White separatism in the United States and Western Europe seeks separation of the white race and limits to nonwhite immigration under the argument that these policies are necessary for white race's survival.

Religious separatism

Religious separatist groups and sects want to withdraw from some larger religious groups and/or believe they should interact primarily with coreligionists:
 English Christians in the 16th and 17th centuries who wished to separate from the Church of England and form independent local churches were influential politically under Oliver Cromwell, who was himself a separatist. They were eventually called Congregationalists. The Pilgrims who established the first successful colony in New England were separatists.
 Christian separatist groups in Indonesia, India and South Carolina (United States) 
 Zionism sought the creation of the State of Israel as a Jewish homeland, with separation from gentile Palestinians. Simon Dubnow, who had mixed feelings toward Zionism, formulated Jewish Autonomism, which was adopted in eastern Europe by Jewish political parties such as the Bund and his own Folkspartei before World War II. Zionism can also be seen as somewhat ethnic too, however, as its definition of who is Jewish has often included people of Jewish background who do not practice the Jewish religion. It is further complicated as some who had ancestors who converted to Judaism, such as some Ethiopian Jews, may not share ethnic history with the Jews, however, are considered to be so but not without debate.

 The Partition of India and (later Pakistan and Bangladesh) arose as a result of separatism on the part of Muslims.
 Sikhs in India sought an independent nation of Khalistan after an agitation in the 1970s and 1980s for implementation of the Anandpur Sahib Resolution (demanding things such as a greater share of river water and autonomy for Punjab) resulted in the storming of the Harimandir Sahib (Golden Temple) by the Government of India troops in 1984. The storming of the temple to flush out Sikh Militants who were gaining momentum in their agitation for greater autonomy for Punjab resulted in Sikhs demanding an independent state for the Sikhs situated in Punjab known as Khalistan. The conflict escalated and led to an assassination of the Prime Minister of India Indira Gandhi as a retaliation of an Indian military operation called 'Operation Blue Star' directed against the Sikhs' holiest shrine, the Golden Temple, in which many innocent Sikh civilians too lost their lives. The revenge murder of Gandhi evoked a Congress Party led backlash in the form of the Sikh genocide, which started in New Delhi and swept India in November 1984. That only further strengthened the Khalistan Movement, but it was largely subdued owing to the efforts of the police in Punjab. The controversial response by the Punjab State reportedly involved the use of human rights violations in the form of unexplained disappearances, faked encounters killings, rape and torture. However, many in the Sikh diaspora in the West and even Sikhs in India, still support the idea of Khalistan, but support is dying and generally the Indian Sikh population is patriotic towards India or at least not supportive of the idea of Khalistan.
Muslim separatist groups in the Philippines (Mindanao and other regions: Moro Islamic Liberation Front, Abu Sayyaf), in Thailand (see also South Thailand insurgency), in India (see also Insurgency in Jammu and Kashmir), in the People's Republic of China (Xinjiang: East Turkestan Islamic Movement), Tanzania (Zanzibarian separatist movements), in the Central African Republic (Regions that are inhabited by Muslims: Séléka), in Russia (in the Northern Caucasus, especially in Chechnya: Caucasus Emirate), in Yugoslavia (Bosnia and Herzegovina: Alija Izetbegovic espoused an Islamic inspired separatism)

Governmental responses

How far separatist demands will go toward full independence, and whether groups pursue constitutional and nonviolent action or armed violence, depend on a variety of economic, political, social and cultural factors, including movement leadership and the government's response. Governments may respond in a number of ways, some of which are mutually exclusive. Some include:

 accede to separatist demands
 improve the circumstances of disadvantaged minorities, be they religious, linguistic, territorial, economic or political
 adopt "asymmetric federalism" where different states have different relations to the central government depending on separatist demands or considerations
 Allow minorities to win in political disputes about which they feel strongly, through parliamentary voting, referendum, etc.
 Settle for a confederation or a commonwealth relationship where there are only limited ties among states.
Most governments suppress any separatist movement in their own country, but support separatism in other countries.

See also

Lists
Lists of separatist movements
Lists of active separatist movements
List of active separatist movements recognized by intergovernmental organizations
List of historical separatist movements
List of states with limited recognition
Lists of ethnic groups
List of indigenous peoples

General

Annexation
Autonomism (political doctrine)
Ethnic nationalism
Ethnic minority
Ethnocentrism
Homeland
Identity politics
Intersectionality
Kinship
Language secessionism
Micronation
Military occupation
Multiculturalism
Minority group
Nation
Polarization
Partition
Refugee
Secession
Stateless nation
Unrepresented Nations and Peoples Organization
Orania
Volkstaat

References

Further reading

External links

From Spain to Iraq, states have to see that suppressing secession won't work

 
Political theories
Politics and race
Religion and politics
Independence movements
Secession
Segregation
Nationalism